Premanand Swami (1784–1855) was a saint of the Swaminarayan Sampradaya and one of Swaminarayan's paramhansas.

Biography 

Premanand Swami was born to Hindu (Brahmin) parents in the town of Ogan, Viramgam in 1784 and named Hathiram on birth. His parents abandoned him at a young age. 

Premanand Swami was born into a Sathodara Nagar Brahmin family in a village near Nadiad (some say that he was born in the village Dora, near Bharuch) around 1784 CE (Samvat 1840). His mother was very beautiful but his father was treated as a lunatic by the people. So, after his birth, people started slandering the mother. They said, “This child is illegitimate, so the mother should either disown him or kill him. We are not going to accept it in our family.” This caused great pain to the mother. However, bowing to social pressure, one early morning she pressed the child against her chest, went out of thevillage and left the child in the hole of a tree. After some time a carder passing by suddenly saw the child lying in the hole of the tree. His joy knew no bounds on seeing the child. He thought, “I have no child of my own; here is God’s gift.” He carried the child home and said to his wife, “Look here. God has sent this child to us. Let us rejoice.’’ With these words, he handed over the child to his wife.

Some years later this carder visited Jetpur with his son, who was then eleven-years-old. At that time, Ramanand Swami was handing over the reins of the Sampraday to his spiritual heir, Sahajanand Swami. A grand festival was being celebrated to mark the spiritual coronation of Sahajanand Swami. Thousands of devotees had come there from different parts of the country. The carder felt that he was lucky to have this opportunity of witnessing a Hindu festival.

On the day of the coronation Sahajanand Swami mounted a horse and he was taken out in a colourful procession through the streets of the town. The carder also turned up to watch the holy procession. His son, too, watched while holding the hand of his foster father. All of a sudden, the boy freed himself and made his way through the jostling crowds up to the horse of Sahajanand Swami. He held the stirrup of the horse and started walking alongside. Shriji Maharaj saw the boy walking by the side of his horse holding the stirrup. The boy walked like this throughout the town until the procession came to a halt at Unnad Khachar’s darbar. Here, in Unnad Khachar’s darbar, was the ashram of Ramanand Swami. The procession terminated here and after dismounting his horse Sahajanand Swami immediately went inside the ashram. The boy was so tired that he soon fell asleep on the steps of the ashram. After some time Maharaj remembered the boy, came out to look for him and found him sleeping on the steps. Maharaj stroked the boy’s head and when he awoke offered him food and water. Meanwhile, his father accompanied by some relatives came there looking for the lost child. He was very happy to see his son. He said to Maharaj, “This is my son and I am taking him home.” Maharaj gave his consent, but the boy refused to budge from the spot. The father tried his best to persuade him; he even threatened to beat him, but the boy refused to accompany the father home. At last the father gave in and went away thinking,

“After all he was not my son.” Shriji Maharaj then asked the boy, “What have you decided?” The boy replied, “I want to stay with you.” The omniscient Maharaj knew about his past samskars and so he said to him, “You go to Ujjain. There is a school of music on the opposite bank of the river Kshipra. You go there and learn music. After attaining this knowledge return to this region and meet me.”

In accordance with this command of Shriji Maharaj the boy set out for Ujjain and arrived at the music school. The principal of the school inquired about the purpose of his visit. The boy expressed his desire to stay there. So he was employed as a servant. With great enthusiasm the boy started serving in the institution. The music teacher was pleased with the boy and offered him lessons in music. Due to certain innate powers and the blessings of Shriji Maharaj, the boy attained mastery in both vocal and instrumental music within a few years. One day he suddenly remembered Maharaj. He left Ujjain in search of Maharaj and by his inspiration arrived in Gadhada.

Maharaj recognized him and lovingly embraced him. He kept the boy for some time with him and then gave him diksha in around 1814 CE (Samvat 1870) and named him ‘Nijbodhanand’. He learned a little Sanskrit also, as per the wish of Maharaj.

Once Maharaj called him in his presence and asked him to compose kirtans. Although he hadn’t studied the pingal branch of music he started composing kirtans as per the wish of Maharaj. He minutely observed all the parts of Maharaj’s body and the first kirtan he composed was a beautiful one describing the murti of Maharaj. Maharaj was extremely pleased on hearing it. However, the name ‘Nijbodhanand’ appearing towards the end of the kirtan did not rhyme properly, so Maharaj said, “Just as words Brahma, Mukta, Nishkula rhyme properly, the word ‘Prema’ will also rhyme. So from today your name is ‘Premanand’.” Once, in one of the kirtans he referred to Chandrasakhi, one of the gopis of Shri Krishna. Maharaj was greatly impressed by his premlakshana bhakti – intense affection and devotion – and called him by the name of ‘Premsakhi’. Maharaj directed him to write kirtans using both these names.

Once, on the occasion of Ashadh sud 11 (Devpodhi Ekadashi), Maharaj was giving special vows to be observed during the auspicious chaturmas. At that time Premanand Swami got up and pledged, “O Maharaj! I pledge that  I will daily compose eight pads in praise of your murti.” Maharaj became very happy to hear him undertake such a difficult vow.

Just as Premanand Swami was overflowing with affectionate devotion towards Maharaj, Maharaj also always bestowed upon him his choicest blessings. He, too, liked to listen to him singing the devotional songs.

Once, late on a winter’s night, Premanand Swami took his sarangi and started singing. The notes of the sarangi and his sarangi-like voice filled the air. The sweet words of the bhajan in praise of Maharaj reached the Akshar Ordi. The devotional song stirred Maharaj, who, despite the biting cold, went to where Premanand Swami was singing and quietly stood behind him, listening to him singing kirtans with utmost concentration. Premanand Swami who had become engrossed in the divine murti of Maharaj continued to sing one bhajan after another. The chilly, winter night passed. At dawn when he put aside his sarangi and stopped singing, he heard the soothing, affectionate voice of Maharaj. Premanand Swami turned around and fell at the feet of Maharaj, asking, “O Merciful Maharaj, how is it that you are here?”

“I have spent the whole night standing here listening to your melodious kirtans. Still I feel like listening to more.” Premanand Swami was deeply moved to hear Maharaj paying compliments to him.

Maharaj greatly appreciated Premanand Swami’s devotion and poetry. He used to bestow divine bliss upon him in many ways. Once, Maharaj, accompanied by many sadhus, went to Kutch. There, Maharaj put his hand around Premanand Swami and asked him to do likewise as they walked through the bazaar of Bhuj singing kirtans. Premanand Swami sang one line and Maharaj sang the next. Thus, through such divine exploits Maharaj bestowed upon him many such unique memories.

Musician's of Gwalior Appreciate Premanand Swami's Singing 

Once, the Nawab of Junagadh heard the music of Premanand Swami at the Swaminarayan Mandir. He felt, “Such singing from the depth of the soul is not possible anywhere in the world.” Some time later some musicians from Gwalior came to sing the drupad rag before the Nawab. He told them, ‘‘After listening to Premanand, a sadhu of Swaminarayan, I no longer listen to anybody else’s music. His singing is matchless in this world.”

So, the musicians went to Gadhada to see Maharaj. It was noon when they arrived at Dada Khachar’s darbar. The assembly was about to disperse. But the musicians expressed their earnest desire to hear the music of Premanand Swami. Maharaj obliged and asked Premanand Swami to sing. Shriji Maharaj said him, “Sing the bhairav rag.” The musicians were amused to hear the request to sing at noon a rag which was traditionally sung at dawn.

"Chandan charchit Neel Kalevar..." the moment Premanand Swami began to sing the surrounding mood changed and everyone experienced the atmosphere of dawn.  The melodious notes of the bhairav rag flowing through his voice turned the noon into a cool refreshing dawn. The musicians became oblivious of everything on hearing the music of Premanand Swami.

Music and Poetry 

Premanand Swami was known for his poetic and musical talent. Premanand Swami composed the words of the Chesta Pad, which is sung and recited daily at all Swaminarayan Temples. He also wrote the Premanand Kavya. Swaminarayan also often referred to him as "Premsakhi."
Gopalanand Swami requested Premanand Swami to compile the Chesta Pad, which vividly describes Swaminarayan's daily routine and habits. Premanand Swami compiled the Vandu Pad, prior to Swaminarayan's death, for the purpose of meditation. The Vandu Pad describes the beauty and appearance of Swaminarayan.

Once, a devotee of Mataji came to Maharaj and sang a ballad praising her. Maharaj drew the attention of the sadhus towards the sincerity and devotion of that devotee. Premanand Swami got up and instantly composed a kirtan while focusing on the murti of Maharaj. He sang:

“Vandu Sahajãnand rasrup anupam sãrne re lol,

Jene bhajtã chhute fand, kare bhav pãr ne re lol...”

Maharaj Himself started swaying to the beats and tunes of this bhajan. The whole assembly was completely spellbound. When these eight pads were over, Maharaj could not hide his joy. He said to Swami, “You have sung very beautiful kirtans. Hearing these kirtans, I thought that this sadhu has so much focus on the murti of God, that I should get up and prostrate to him. If one meditates on God in the way described in these pads, one is liberated from the clutches of kal, karma and maya.”

Once, after attending the arti, Shriji Maharaj entered the room of Vasudev Narayan. Here, Laduba and Jivuba asked a question to Maharaj, “Maharaj, you had given our father your darshan in the form of Shri Krishna. But Shri Krishna is the master of Golok whereas you say you are the master of Akshardham. So, what should we understand?” At that time Maharaj explained to them his form as Purna Purushottam – the supreme God.

Premanand Swami was listening from a distance and composed four verses describing the glory of Maharaj’s murti and his glory as the supreme Godhead.

Ãj mãre orde re, ãvyã avinãshi Albel...

and

Bolyã Shri Hari re, sãmbhalo narnãri harijan...

Maharaj was very pleased to hear these verses.

Premanand Swami has described Maharaj as manifest Purushottam in his devotional songs, and has sung them with such a melodious voice and with so much passion that every word appears charged with devotion and love. He has described every pore of Shriji Maharaj’s body in great detail in language which is an inexhaustible spring of pure love. He has described the same thing again and again in various kirtans but his genius lies in giving them a touch of freshness. Every new kirtan reveals his everincreasing love for Maharaj. Even while describing the human actions of Maharaj, his understanding of Maharaj’s divinity becomes one with Maharaj’s human actions. It is as if his heart is flowing out in his kirtans, such is his ever-increasing love.

Pleased with his poetry, Maharaj always respected him on par with great poets like Muktanand Swami, Brahmanand Swami and Nishkulanand Swami. Premanand Swami composed bhajans describing the form and glory of Maharaj to be sung during prabhatiya, godi, arti, prarthana, cheshta, etc.

Shriji Maharaj always looked upon music as an invigorating element in the Bhakti tradition. Whenever religious assemblies were held or when Maharaj visited royal courts, Premanand Swami, Muktanand Swami, Devanand Swami, Brahmanand Swami and others used to charge the atmosphere with their spiritual singing. They sang their own compositions to the accompaniment of musical instruments like dukkad, saroda and sarangi. They used to cast such a spell that even the great music masters were wonderstruck on hearing them.

In the kirtans of Premanand Swami composed after the departure of Shriji Maharaj to his abode, one finds the pangs of separation expressed in a most moving language. On 21 November 1854 (Magshar sud 1, Samvat 1911) his separation from Maharaj ended and he went to Akshardham to be in the presence of Shriji Maharaj.

Works 
The outstanding works by Premsakhi Premanand Swami include:
 Dhyan Manjari
 Narayan Charitra
 Tulsi Vivah
 Gopi Virah 
 Shriharicharitra
Besides these works, he has written over ten thousand bhajans in Gujarati, Hindi and Vraj. His Drupad verses are matchless in Indian music.

Notes

References 
 
 Swaminarayan by H.V. Shivadas
 Premanand Swami
 Life and faith of Swaminarayan

External links 
 Ahmedabad Swaminarayan Sampradaya
 BAPS Swaminarayan Sampradaya

Swaminarayan Sampradaya
1784 births
1855 deaths